Passion is the third studio album by American singer Regina Belle. It was released by Columbia Records on February 16, 1993 in the United States. Belle consulted producers James Anthony Carmichael, Nick Martinelli, and Narada Michael Walden to work with her on the album. Upon release, it peaked at number 63 on the US Billboard 200 and number 13 on the Top R&B/Hip-Hop Albums, selling over 389,000 copies according to Nielsen Soundscan.

The album produced the singles, "Dream in Color", "If I Could" and "The Deeper I Love," the latter of which failed to reach the main chart but did peak at number 7 on the Bubbling Under R&B/Hip-Hop Singles chart. Passion also includes "A Whole New World," Belle's duet with Peabo Bryson from Disney's 1992 animated film Aladdin (1992).

Critical reception

AllMusic editor Craig Lytle  found that with Passion "Belle presents an album that steadfastly utilizes her vocal attributes [...] Every song here is worthy of chart attention. The majority of the songs are ballads and mid-tempo numbers [...] As the title indicates, Belle extends much passion in each one of these songs. She's lacking nothing on any one of these performances and the material is appropriately suited to the songstress [...] From the jazzy blues to the soulful R&B and pop-oriented tunes, Belle's vocals are mesmerizing to the last note."

Track listing

Notes
  denotes an associate producer

Charts

Certifications

References

Regina Belle albums
1993 albums
Albums produced by Walter Afanasieff
Albums produced by Narada Michael Walden
Columbia Records albums